Jens Jeremies (born 5 March 1974) is a German former professional footballer who played as a defensive midfielder.

Best known for his tackling abilities, he played for three clubs during his professional career, most notably Bayern Munich which he helped to 16 titles, 12 as an important unit, in a career also marred by many injuries.

Jeremies won 55 caps for Germany, representing the nation in two World Cups and as many European Championships and helping it finish second in the 2002 World Cup.

Club career

Beginnings; 1860 Munich
Born in Görlitz, East Germany, Jeremies joined the youth system of one of the most important clubs in the country, Dynamo Dresden, at the age of 12. As a professional, he appeared rarely over the course of two seasons, all the matches being played in 1994–95, his debut coming on 1 April 1995 in a 1–3 away loss against TSV 1860 München, as the team ended a four-stay in the Bundesliga.

In 1995, Jeremies signed for 1860 Munich, helping the Lions qualify for the UEFA Cup in his second year and receiving totals of 30 yellow cards and two red during his three-year spell.

Bayern Munich
Jeremies moved to TSV's city neighbours FC Bayern Munich in the summer of 1998, the club for which he would play the remainder of his career. With the Bavarians he won all of his trophies, including six leagues and three domestic cups, adding the 2000–01 edition of the UEFA Champions League to which he contributed with 12 games and three goals, including one in the 2–1 semifinal win against Real Madrid (3–1 on aggregate) – he missed the final through suspension.

After only 20 matches combined in his last two years, mainly due to constant knee problems, Jeremies retired from football at the age of 32. He appeared in 251 German top division matches during 12 seasons, scoring nine times.

International career
Whilst at TSV Munich, Jeremies made his debut for the German national team on 15 November 1997 in a friendly against South Africa, playing the full 90 minutes in a 3–0 win in Düsseldorf. He was then picked for the squad at the 1998 FIFA World Cup, appearing in three games in an eventual last-eight exit; during the competition, German entertainer Harald Schmidt reverentially called him "Jens Jerenaldo".

On 31 March 1999, Jeremies scored his first and only international goal, helping to a 2–0 home win against Finland for the UEFA Euro 2000 qualifiers, which was later chosen as Goal of the Month in Germany. However, he was dropped from the national team during the buildup to the finals, after calling the Erich Ribbeck-led side "pitiful".

Jeremies was reinstated for the 2002 World Cup, even captaining the team once in a friendly after the competition, but retired from international football after Germany's group stage exit in Euro 2004 in Portugal, saying he wanted to focus on his club duties with Bayern.

Career statistics

Club
Source:

1.Includes 2001 Intercontinental Cup.

International goals
Scores and results list Germany's goal tally first.

Honours

Club
Bayern Munich
Bundesliga: 1998–99, 1999–2000, 2000–01, 2002–03, 2004–05, 2005–06
DFB-Pokal: 1999–2000, 2002–03, 2004–05, 2005–06; Runner-up 1998–99
DFB-Ligapokal: 1998, 2004
UEFA Champions League: 2000–01; Runner-up 1998–99

International
Germany
FIFA World Cup: Runner-up 2002

Individual
kicker Bundesliga Team of the Season: 1995–96, 1997–98, 1998–99

References

External links

1974 births
Living people
People from Görlitz
German footballers
Association football midfielders
Bundesliga players
Dynamo Dresden players
Dynamo Dresden II players
TSV 1860 Munich players
FC Bayern Munich footballers
Germany under-21 international footballers
Germany international footballers
1998 FIFA World Cup players
2002 FIFA World Cup players
UEFA Euro 2000 players
UEFA Euro 2004 players
UEFA Champions League winning players
Footballers from Saxony
East German footballers
People from Bezirk Dresden